Sadopaideia: Being the Experiences of Cecil Prendergast Undergraduate of the University of Oxford Shewing How he was Led Through the Pleasant Paths of Masochism to the Supreme joys of Sadism is a pornographic novel published in 1907 by "Ashantee of Edinburgh": probably Charles Carrington in Paris.  It was later published in the United States by Grove Press (GP-421).  In two volumes, it is the story of a man who experiences both dominance and submission.  It was written anonymously but Anthony Storr attributes it to Algernon Charles Swinburne.

References

1907 British novels
British erotic novels
British pornography
Pornographic novels
Works published anonymously
BDSM literature